Love Minus Zero may refer to:

 Love Minus Zero Recordings, a record company
 "Love Minus Zero/No Limit", a song by Bob Dylan